Osama most commonly refers to Osama bin Laden (1957–2011), the founder of al-Qaeda.

Osama or Usama may also refer to:

Film
 Osama (film), a 2003 film made in Afghanistan
 Being Osama, a 2004 documentary film of six men named Osama
 Main Osama, an upcoming Indian film

Other uses
 Osama (name)
 "Osama" (song), 2021 single by Zakes Bantwini
 Dinner With Osama, collection of short stories by Marilyn Krysl
 Osama (novel), a World Fantasy Award-winning novel by Lavie Tidhar

See also
 Ōsama
 Ōsama Game, a Japanese 2011 horror film
 Osamu